Executive Aerospace was a charter airline based in Johannesburg, South Africa. It was established in 1984 and operated charter services for South Africa's leading tour and conference operators, as well as sports unions.

Fleet 

On March 2007 the Executive Aerospace fleet included:

4 BAe 748 Series 2B
2 McDonnell Douglas DC-9-30 (Never owned, Leased from Global Aviation and released to South African Express) Lease expired

Liquidation

The company was placed in liquidation on 27 Feb 2008 by the Durban High Court (notice D97/07).

External links 
Executive Aerospace

References 

Airlines established in 1984
Companies based in Johannesburg
Defunct airlines of South Africa
2008 disestablishments in South Africa
South African companies established in 1984